Troy Patrick Cate (born October 21, 1980) is a former Major League Baseball pitcher. He played in MLB for the St. Louis Cardinals.

He went to school and played baseball at Ricks College. After finishing school there, he served as a Mormon missionary in England.

Career

Seattle Mariners
Cate was drafted by the Seattle Mariners in the 6th round of the 2002 Major League Baseball Draft, 190th overall. He signed with the Mariners and was assigned to the Everett AquaSox. In 2003, he played for the advanced A-ball Inland Empire 66ers and the AAA Tacoma Rainiers. In 2004 he played for Inland Empire and the AA San Antonio Missions. In 2005, Cate spent the entire season with Inland Empire and became a free agent at seasons end.

St. Louis Cardinals
Cate signed a minor league contract with the St. Louis Cardinals organization in the 2005/2006 offseason, and spent 2006 with the advanced A-ball Palm Beach Cardinals and AA Springfield Cardinals. He began 2007 for the AAA Memphis Redbirds. He made his major league debut for the St. Louis Cardinals on May 27, 2007, against the Washington Nationals. On the season, Cate pitched in to a 3.38 ERA over 14 games for the Cardinals paired with 12 strikeouts. He became a free agent after the season.

Oakland Athletics
The Oakland Athletics signed Cate to a minor league contract with an invitation to spring training on November 21, 2007. On May 12, 2008, Cate was released by the Athletics organization after playing in 12 games for the AAA Sacramento River Cats.

Orange County Flyers
He signed with the Orange County Flyers of the Golden Baseball League shortly after his release. Cate pitched to a 1.15 ERA with 18 strikeouts over 3 games for the Flyers.

Milwaukee Brewers
On June 23, 2008, Cate signed a minor league contract with the Milwaukee Brewers and was assigned to the Huntsville Stars of the Double-A Southern League. On July 22, he was promoted to Triple-A Nashville. He became a free agent at the end of the season.

Toronto Blue Jays
On July 27, 2009, Cate signed a minor league deal with the Toronto Blue Jays organization and was assigned to the AA New Hampshire Fisher Cats. He played in 1 game for New Hampshire and was released on August 4, 2009.

Quebec Capitales
In 2010, Cate signed with the Quebec Capitales of the Can-Am League. He would play in 12 games and pitch to a 3.39 ERA over 74.1 innings pitched. He became a free agent after the season.

Somerset Patriots
In 2011, Cate signed with the Somerset Patriots of the Atlantic League of Professional Baseball. Cate only pitched in 3 games for Somerset before being released.

Calgary Vipers
Shortly after his release, Cate signed with the Calgary Vipers of the North American League. He would pitch in 1 game for Calgary, allowing 6 runs over 4 innings. He would become a free agent at the end of the season.

External links

1980 births
Living people
St. Louis Cardinals players
Baseball players from California
American sportspeople in doping cases
Ricks Vikings baseball players
Major League Baseball pitchers
Everett AquaSox players
Inland Empire 66ers of San Bernardino players
Tacoma Rainiers players
San Antonio Missions players
Palm Beach Cardinals players
Springfield Cardinals players
Memphis Redbirds players
Huntsville Stars players
Orange County Flyers players
Sacramento River Cats players
Nashville Sounds players
New Hampshire Fisher Cats players
Long Island Ducks players
Québec Capitales players
Somerset Patriots players
People from Fallbrook, California